A & J Inglis, Ltd, was a shipbuilding firm founded by Anthony Inglis and his brother John, engineers and shipbuilders in Glasgow, Scotland in 1862. The firm built over 500 ships in a period of just over 100 years. Their Pointhouse Shipyard was at the confluence of the rivers Clyde and Kelvin. They constructed a wide range of ships, including Clyde steamers, paddle steamers and small ocean liners. In wartime, they built small warships, and in the period after World War II, they built a number of whalers.

History

A & J Inglis of Glasgow was formed in 1848 as an engineering works. Thomas B. Seath founded the shipyard at Pointhouse in 1845 and it was acquired by A & J Inglis in 1862. In 1884 Anthony Inglis died and his son John Inglis took over. John Inglis himself, was well known for many maritime activities. In 1885 they launched 11 ships with a total tonnage of 7,470 tons.

In 1867, a Patent Slip Dock for ship repairs was built at Pointhouse. This was an innovative alternative to a dry dock, invented by Robert Napier. The vessel sat on a big trolley, which was on rails, and was hauled up onto dry land by a powerful winch. The yard had up to 2,000 employees on just 18 acres of ground plus approximately 300 workers at the former premises of the company in Whitehall Foundry.

In 1897, the Transatlantic Company of Paris ordered two of a total of ten fast mail steamers for their African service at A & J Inglis. Inglis delivered two weeks ahead of their competitors. The French owners were impressed and checked carefully that the fast-track build programme had not resulted in an inferior quality, but found no evidence of this, on the contrary they were delighted with the high standard of construction achieved.

Harland and Wolff bought controlling shares in the company in 1919 but the yard remained independent. After Harland and Wolff, who also owned a larger yard on the opposite bank of the river at Govan, opted to consolidate its operations in Belfast, the yard closed in 1962 and is now the site of the new Riverside Museum.

Ships

Clippers and yachts

Some of the first ships built by the shipyard were propelled by a combination of sails and steam engines. Because of their elegant design and high speed they were recognised as leading-edge representatives of their class.

The shipyard became famous by building the British Royal Yacht  and the Egyptian Royal Yacht . The turbine yacht  was built of steel, rigged as a triple screw schooner and, unusually, was powered by steam turbines.

Paddle steamers

Famous ships built by the firm include the paddle steamer , now the world's last seagoing paddle steamer. In ocean-going service, paddle steamers became much less useful after the invention of the screw propeller, but they remained in use in coastal service and as river tugboats, thanks to their shallow draught and good manoeuvrability.

Conversions and extensions
The shipyard was also specialised in conversions: On 16 May 1901 the TS King Edward was launched, which had been built by William Denny and Brothers in Dumbarton. On the next day at the Pointhouse yard of A. & J. Inglis the central propeller of  diameter was exchanged for one of  diameter, and the outer propellers of  diameter were exchanged for propellers  diameter.

In 1905, an extension and rebuild of the SS Mahroussa was undertaken. The ship had been originally built for Isma'il Pasha, the Khedive of Egypt and was later renamed to SS El Horria. The two paddle wheels were replaced by triple screws powered by steam turbines built by Inglis at their Warroch Street Engine Works in Glasgow. Inglis were one of the first companies licensed by the Parsons Marine Steam Turbine Company Wallsend for the manufacture of steam turbines in their own works. The ship was still in use in 2001 as a luxury yacht.

Railway ferries
Inglis built eight ferries between 1907 and 1929 for the Entre Rios Railways Co. in Argentina. These were used between 1907 and 1990 to cross the Paraná River and join the Buenos Aires province and the Entre Rios province, until new bridges were built over the rivers they crossed:

 Lucía Carbó (1907)
 María Parera (1908)
 Mercedes Lacroze (1909)
 Roque Saenz Peña (1911)
 Exequiel Ramos Mejía (1913) 
 Dolores de Urquiza (1926)
 Delfina Mitre (1928)
 Carmen Avellaneda (1929)

Pictures of the Argentine train ferries at the Histarmar website.

Motor vessels
The  was originally christened Lady Sylvia when launched in 1937 for the use on Barkley Sound. She was designed for the sheltered coastal waters of British Columbia. However, this was the first diesel powered vessel to cross the Atlantic driven by a single propeller. Lady Rose was acquired by the Clayton family of Sechelt in September 2019 and she was relocated to the MacKenzie Marina in Sechelt soon thereafter.  Restoration plans are still being formulated.

Lightships
The North Carr Lightship was launched in 1932 and created quite a stir in Edinburgh on account of her fog horn being tested while lying ¾ mile off Granton, Edinburgh in the Firth of Forth. As the fog horn had a range of approximately 10 miles, north Edinburgh could hear it loud and clear and the complaints were numerous - particularly as it was being sounded in clear weather. "Hundreds of city dwellers have had no sleep over three consecutive nights" and "The most flagrant individual breach of the peace is as nothing compared with the ceaseless boom and consequent suffering of the past three nights" were typical statements at the time.

Selection of military ships

During the Second World War the shipyard diversified into the built of military ships:

  laid down 13 October 1939, launched 23 May 1940 and completed 17 August 1940. Transferred to Greece as Kriezis.
  laid down 26 October 1939, launched 26 June 1940 and completed 20 October 1940. 
  and  – s - Both launched 1940, sold 1946
  –  naval trawler – Launched 1941, sold 1946
  – Shakespearian-class naval trawler – Launched 3 May 1941, transferred to Kenya 1946, joined Royal East African Navy 1952, redeployed to Madagascar 1964 
  was a  that was launched on 28 September 1943 and served in the Royal Canadian Navy.
 ,  and  –  naval trawlers - Launched 1942-43 
  –  – Launched 10 December 1944, Became OWS Weather Reporter in 1957. 
  – originally Totnes Castle – Castle-class corvette – Launched  12 April 1944. Transferred to Canada as HMCS Humberstone 1944. Sold for mercantile service 1947 
   was an  Empire  coaster. Launched on 19 January 1945 and completed in April 1945. Sold in 1948 to Kuwait Oil Company and renamed Adib. Operated under the management of Angli-Iranian Oil Co Ltd. Sold in 1952 to Shell-Mex and BP Ltd and renamed BP Transporter. Scrapped in June 1965 in Antwerp, Belgium.

Cancelled military orders
Several military orders for corvettes and tankers were cancelled at the end of the Second World War:

 Dover Castle and Dudley Castle - Castle class corvettes - ordered 19 January 1943. 
 Empire Tedellen was to have been an  coastal tanker but the contract for building her was cancelled. The Empire ships were a series of ships in the service of the British Government. Their names were all prefixed with "Empire". Mostly they were used during World War II by the Ministry of War Transport (MoWT), who owned the ships but contracted out their management to various shipping lines.

References

External links

South American and Australian paddle steamers built by A & J Inglis
Paddleducks with high-resolution photographs of the ship yard.
A & J Inglis of Pointhouse : Shipbuilders and Engineers

Defunct shipbuilding companies of Scotland
1862 establishments in Scotland
1962 disestablishments in Scotland
Partick
Companies based in Glasgow
River Clyde
British companies established in 1862
British companies disestablished in 1962